Shahpur is  a notified area in Ahmedabad in the Indian state of Gujarat.
Shahpur is a ward of Dariapur (Vidhan Sabha constituency) .

This village is in Ahmedabad district.

Geography

Cities and towns in Ahmedabad district
Neighbourhoods in Ahmedabad